The Tantura massacre took place on the night of 22–23 May 1948 during the 1948 Arab–Israeli War, when around 40-200 Palestinian Arabs were massacred by the Israeli Defense Force's Alexandroni Brigade, following the surrender of Tantura, a village of roughly 1,500 people in 1945 located near Haifa.

Background

Tantura was a Palestinian village within the territory assigned to a Jewish state in the 1947 United Nations Partition Plan for Palestine. As part of Plan Dalet, formulated in March 1948, ahead of the 14 May 1948 Israeli Declaration of Independence, the Haganah assigned the Alexandroni Brigade for the "occupation of al-Tantura and al-Furaydis". Of the brigade's four battalions, the 33rd was assigned to Tantura.

Event narratives 
On the night of 22–23 May 1948, Tantura was attacked by the 33rd Battalion of the Alexandroni Brigade. In the aftermath of that attack, based on the testimonies of Tantura villagers, historian Walid Khalidi has estimated that 40 young men from Tantura were shot and buried in a communal grave. He published these findings as part of a correspondence in The Spectator with Erskine Barton Childers, Jon Kimche, (published 12 May-4 August 1961, and republished in 1988 in the Journal of Palestine Studies).

The testimonies, while described as "inevitably fragmented" and from individuals caught in events "beyond their capacity to comprehend", was supplemented by further testimonies in the 1998 thesis The Exodus of the Arabs from the Villages at the foot of Mount Carmel, submitted by postgraduate researcher Theodore Katz to the University of Haifa.

Research on the event was then further expanded upon by further testimonies gathered by Mustafa al-Wali from tens of interviews that were published in the Summer 2000 issue that year of Majallat al-Dirasat al-Filastiniyya, a quarterly of the Journal of Palestinian Studies. Muhammad Abu Hana, who was  child at the time of the events in Tantura and now a displaced person in the Yarmouk Camp, recounted:

There are multiple testimonies that Yaacov, the mukhtar of the nearby Jewish village of Zichron Yaacov and a friend of Tantura's mukhtar, attempted to intercede on behalf of the villagers. In 2002, The News & Observer interviewed Jawdat Hindi, a daughter of Tantura's mukhtar, who said Yaacov "arrived, shouting at the Jewish soldiers", and, at a later point "he was crying, saying that we did not expect such a day and such a happening to our neighbors".

Katz controversy 
In January 2000 Israeli journalist Amir Gilat published an article about the events at Tantura in Ma'ariv, focusing on the 1998 thesis of Katz. Following the publicity, Alexandroni Brigade veterans protested, and Gilat wrote a follow-up piece including their denial that a massacre had occurred. The veterans sued Katz for libel (asking for 1 million shekels, or $321,000, in damages).

In the resulting court case, after two days' cross-examination, Katz agreed to an out-of-court settlement that involved him signing a statement nullifying the conclusions of his research, namely that extrajudicial killings were committed after the surrender of the village. The next day at court, judge Drora Pilpel announced the case close. Katz, however, then attempted to rescind his statement, explaining that he had signed it in a "moment of weakness that he already deeply regretted", and that it "did not represent what he really felt about his work". After several further hours of deliberation, judge Pilpel upheld the decision to close "based on her conviction that a contract between parties must be respected, though "she emphasized that her decision did not relate in any way to the content, accuracy or veracity of the libel suit". Katz subsequently appealed to the Supreme Court, which upheld the decision of the lower court for the same reasons.

In the wake of this case, the University of Haifa suspended Katz's degree, which had originally received a grade of 97%, inviting him to revise his thesis. The paper was sent out to five external examiners, a majority (3:2) of whom failed it. Katz was subsequently awarded a "non-research" MA.

Academic commentary 

The historian Ilan Pappé supported Katz and his thesis, and has challenged the Israeli veterans to take him to court, saying he has evidence that the massacre occurred. In a 2001 article in the Journal of Palestine Studies, Pappé defended the use of oral history with reference to the USA. He pointed out that that history was obtained by Katz, not only from Palestinian villagers, but also from Israeli soldiers. Pappé provided new evidence that had come to light after Katz had presented his thesis, in one case quoting (with reference to the IDF source file) "from a document from the Alexandroni Brigade to IDF headquarters in June notes: 'We have tended to the mass grave, and everything is in order'”, and in another, published testimonies by eyewitnesses who had been located in Syria. He also related the background to Katz's original signed repudiation of his thesis.

In 2004, Israeli historian Benny Morris extensively reviewed the Tantura controversy and recounted himself coming away "with a deep sense of unease". He suggested that, while it is unclear whether or not a massacre occurred, there was no doubt that war crimes were committed by the Jewish forces (Haganah) and that the village was forcibly cleansed of its Arab inhabitants. Morris believes that one village woman was raped, Alexandroni troops may have executed POWs and there may have been some looting, based on an army report that uses the Hebrew word khabala (sabotage).

Morris underlined the fact that in interviews conducted by himself and by the Ma'ariv reporter Amir Gilat, all refugees
confirmed that a massacre had taken place, while all IDF veterans denied it. Regarding the latter, Morris describes what he calls “troubling hints”, such as a diary by an Alexandroni soldier, Tulik Makovsky, in which he wrote “… that our boys know the craft of murder quite well, especially boys whose relatives the Arabs had murdered... or those harmed by Hitler [they are the same fascists]. They took their private revenge, and avenged our comrades who had died at their hands, against the snipers”. Morris also noted that, given the political sensitivities at the time, the word khabala may have been used as a euphemism for a massacre.

Morris further pointed out issues with the scoring of the second version of Katz's thesis in that the two referees who gave anomalously low scores had been co-authors of an IDF book in which it was argued that ”… the Israeli Army had carried out only a ‘partial expulsion’ of the populations of the Arab towns of Lydda and Ramlah and dismissed the charge that the troops had massacred Lydda townspeople, some of them inside a mosque, on July 12, 1948”, whereas IDF records from the IDF archive show that a full-scale expulsion had been carried out and that Yiftah Brigade troops killed some 250 townspeople.

There were plans in 2004 to exhume bodies from a site between Nahsholim and Dor believed to be a mass grave, but this has not happened. In 2006, Katz's presentation of the facts was disputed again by the Israeli historian Yoav Gelber who was to play a key role in discrediting Katz's research.

Subsequent developments 

In January 2022, a documentary film on the subject by Alon Schwarz called Tantura was screened at the 2022 Sundance Film Festival. Several Israeli veterans interviewed said they had witnessed a massacre at Tantura after the village had surrendered. Many of the interviewees gave descriptions, with the numbers of victims who were shot dead from “a few” to “several dozen” or “more than 200”. The latter estimate was provided by a resident of Zikhron Ya'akov who stated he had helped bury the victims. They affirmed that soldiers in the Alexandroni Brigade had murdered unarmed men after the battle had ended, and the victims were indeed buried in a mass grave, now located under the Dor Beach parking lot near Nahsholim kibbutz. Other interviewees explicitly denied a massacre had taken place. The screening also prompted entities including the Palestinian Authority and the editorial board of Haaretz to call for a commission to investigate another alleged mass grave site near Mount Carmel.

University of Haifa history professor Yoav Gelber told Schwarz in Tantura Katz's thesis was flawed due to its heavy reliance on oral testimony, and later criticized the film after it was screened due to what The New York Times paraphrased as "a paucity of other documentation [besides oral sources]." The family of one of the veterans interviewed accused Schwarz of misrepresenting the veteran's account, and another veteran said a massacre had happened but told The New York Times that the Israeli soldiers had acted without orders.

References

Notes

Citations

Sources

Further reading

External links 
Israeli Myths & Propaganda. Part 3 (Interview with Ilan Pappé)

1948 massacres of Palestinians
May 1948 events in Asia
Controversies in Israel
1948 in Israel
Massacres in Israel